Epistrophella emarginata is a common North American species of hoverfly. Larvae are aphid predators  When laying eggs, the female oviposits on the petioles of a leaf.

Distribution 

USA: D.C., Alabama, Alaska, Arkansas, Indiana, Illinois, Iowa, Kansas, Maine, Maryland, Michigan, Massachusetts, Minnesota, Missouri, Nebraska, New Hampshire, New Jersey, New York, North Carolina, Ohio, Oklahoma, Pennsylvania, Tennessee, Vermont, Virginia, West Virginia, Wisconsin.
Canada: Saskatchewan, Alberta, Manitoba, Ontario, Quebec, Nova Scotia, New Brunswick	
Central America: Mexico, El Salvador

References

Syrphinae
Syrphini
Insects described in 1823
Diptera of North America